Jorge Miramón Santagertrudis (born 2 June 1989) is a Spanish professional footballer who plays for CD Leganés as either a right-back or a midfielder.

Club career
Born in Zaragoza, Aragon, Miramón graduated with Real Zaragoza's youth setup, and made his senior debuts for the reserves in 2008, in Tercera División. On 15 July 2010, he moved to another reserve team, Atlético Madrid B in Segunda División B.

In July 2011 Miramón signed for Andorra CF also in the third level. On 14 June of the following year he joined fellow league team Lleida Esportiu, after suffering administrative relegation with the latter.

On 6 July 2015, Miramón signed a one-year deal with CD Leganés in Segunda División. He made his professional debut on 23 August at the age of 26, coming on as a second-half substitute for Omar Ramos in a 2–3 away loss against UD Almería.

Miramón scored his first professional goal on 29 May 2016, netting the last in a 2–0 home win against UE Llagostera. He contributed with 22 appearances during the campaign, as his side achieved promotion to La Liga for the first time ever.

On 19 July 2016, Miramón signed a one-year contract with CF Reus Deportiu in the second division, after cutting ties with Lega. He was converted into a right back during his first season, and renewed his contract for a further campaign on 29 June 2017.

On 6 June 2018, Miramón signed a one-year deal with SD Huesca, newly promoted to La Liga. He made his debut in the main category on 19 August, starting in a 2–1 away win against SD Eibar.

On 28 June 2019, after suffering relegation, Miramón signed for Levante UD on a two-year deal. On 19 July 2022, after another drop, he returned to Leganés on a one-year contract.

References

External links

1989 births
Living people
Footballers from Zaragoza
Spanish footballers
Association football defenders
Association football midfielders
La Liga players
Segunda División players
Segunda División B players
Tercera División players
Real Zaragoza B players
Atlético Madrid B players
Lleida Esportiu footballers
CD Leganés players
CF Reus Deportiu players
SD Huesca footballers
Levante UD footballers